Johannes Orasmaa, until 1935 Johannes Roska (3 December 1890 – 24 May 1943) was an Estonian General.

Johannes Orasmaa was born in the village of Joala which then was part of the Governorate of Estonia but which now is included within the city limits of Narva. He fought in World War I as an officer of the Imperial Russian Army, then in the Estonian War of Independence and then pursued a military career. He was promoted to the rank of major-general in 1928 and was commander of the Estonian Defence League between 1925 and 1940. He was awarded the Estonian Cross of Liberty and also the Order of the White Rose of Finland and the Polish Gold Cross of Merit. During the Soviet occupation of Estonia, he was arrested and sent to labour camp by Soviet authorities, where he died in 1943.

References

1890 births
1943 deaths
People from Narva
People from Kreis Wierland
Members of the Estonian National Assembly
Members of the Riiginõukogu
Estonian major generals
Russian military personnel of World War I
Estonian military personnel of the Estonian War of Independence
Recipients of the Order of St. Vladimir, 4th class
Recipients of the Cross of Liberty (Estonia)
Recipients of the Military Order of the Cross of the Eagle, Class I
Recipients of the Military Order of the Cross of the Eagle, Class II
Recipients of the Order of Lāčplēsis, 3rd class
Recipients of the Order of the Three Stars
People who died in the Gulag
Estonian people who died in Soviet detention